Vi Bilägare is one of the biggest automobile magazines in Sweden. The magazine is published in Stockholm.

History and profile
Vi Bilägare was launched in 1930 and is currently being published 16 times a year. The magazine is published by OK Förlaget AB and is headquartered in Stockholm. Typical content includes automotive news and reports, new and used car reviews, test drives, DIY guides and automotive-related product tests.

The magazine is one of the organizers of the European Car of the Year award.

In 2009 Vi Bilägare was the best-selling Swedish automobile magazine with a circulation of 127,000 copies. In 2014 its circulation was 91,400 copies.

References

External links
Official Website

1930 establishments in Sweden
Automobile magazines
Magazines established in 1930
Magazines published in Stockholm
Swedish-language magazines